"Hourglass" was the first single released from Squeeze's seventh album, Babylon and On. Aided by an optical illusion-filled music video directed by Ade Edmondson, it received substantial airplay on MTV, and "Hourglass" became the highest-charting hit the band ever had in the United States, peaking at number 15 on the Billboard Hot 100, while reaching number 16 in the UK Singles Chart.

Background
"Hourglass" was written by Chris Difford and Glenn Tilbrook together in one room; traditionally, the two had written the lyrics and music, respectively, to their songs individually, but, at Tilbrook's suggestion, the two collaborated more directly for "Hourglass". Difford recalled, "I went to Glenn's house and within an hour we'd written 'Hourglass Glenn counteracted some lyrical ideas and I added some musical ideas, then he demoed it and made some changes, and finally the band got hold of it and changed it some more."

Difford stated that the song "doesn't mean much" lyrically, while Tilbrook described the chorus' lyrics as "nonsense words". Musically, Tilbrook wrote the chorus; he explained, "I loved the idea of rapid delivery, which is what the chorus required." Originally written as a more dance-style number, the song took on, in the words of Tilbrook, a typical "Squeeze sound". The song's break and sound effects were contributed by producer Eric "ET" Thorngren.

Release
"Hourglass" was released as the debut single from Babylon & On and became one of the band's biggest hits, reaching number 15 in the US and number 16 in the UK. The single remains the band's highest-charting single in the US. Tilbrook argued that the negative lyrics were "ironic considering it went on to be a chart hit".

The single's success was bolstered by a music video directed by Ade Edmondson, who was recruited by keyboardist Jools Holland. The video featured the band performing the song in a set with surrealist art and optical illusions. The video received an MTV Award for its Art Direction by Nick Edwards and Clive Crotty. Difford later said, "The reason this song exists in my mind is purely for the video."

Track listing
7"
 "Hourglass" (3:16)
 "Wedding Bells" (2:22)

12"
 "Hourglass" (3:16)
 "Splitting into Three" (3:33)
 "Wedding Bells" (2:22)

Charts

References

External links
Squeeze discography at Squeezenet
Promo music video at YouTube

Squeeze (band) songs
1987 singles
Songs written by Glenn Tilbrook
Songs written by Chris Difford
A&M Records singles